"Auguries of Innocence" is a poem by William Blake, from a notebook of his now known as the Pickering Manuscript. It is assumed to have been written in 1803, but was not published until 1863 in the companion volume to Alexander Gilchrist's biography of Blake. The poem contains a series of paradoxes which speak of innocence juxtaposed with evil and corruption. It consists of 132 lines and has been published with and without breaks dividing it into stanzas. An augury is a sign or omen.

The poem begins:

It continues with a catalogue of moralising couplets, such as:

and:

The following lines are quoted in full in the film Dead Man, in Agatha Christie's 1967 novel Endless Night, and the last triplet of these lines was used by Jim Morrison in the lyrics to The Doors''' song End of the Night:

 References 

 

 The Oxford Dictionary of Quotations'', 1986, 3rd Edition, Oxford University Press

Poetry by William Blake